Kuruvila or Kuruvilla is a given masculine name (and also as a surname/lastname where the complete name format is 'X' son of 'Y', and a traditional surname is not used), among the Syriac Christian community of Kerala. The Western equivalent is Cyril (also Cyrillus or Cyryl), also used as a masculine given name. It is derived from the Greek name Κύριλλος (Kýrillos) meaning "Lordly, Masterful", which in turn derives from Greek κυριος (kýrios) "lord". So Kuruvila means "the one belonging to the lord."

Notable people with the name include:
 Vice Admiral Elenjikal Chandy Kuruvila, a former Indian Navy admiral
 Abey Kuruvilla, a cricketer
 T.U. Kuruvila, politician and cabinet minister of Kerala
 Mr. Binu Kuruvila, Aka: Kuruvis, Enterprise Architect (Banking), Singapore www.kuruvis.com
 Dr. Celin Kuruvila, Consultant Physician and Diabetologist, Mumbai, India
 Dr. Kuruvilla Pandikattu, Aka: Kuru, Indian philosopher and priest. www.kuru.in
 Anish Kuruvilla, a film director and actor
 Dr. T. K. Kuruvilla, renowned cardiologist, Ernakulam, Kerala
 Dr. George Kuruvilla, Senior consultant Paediatric-ENT and cochlear implant surgeon
 Dr. Roy B Kuruvilla, Consultant orthopaedics Surgeon